Taurinellushka is a genus of air-breathing land snails, terrestrial pulmonate gastropod mollusks in the family Pristilomatidae.

Species
The genus Taurinellushka includes one species:
 Taurinellushka babugana Balashov, 2014

References

Pristilomatidae